The chestnut wattle-eye (Platysteira castanea) is a species of bird in the family Platysteiridae. It is found in Angola, Cameroon, Central African Republic, Republic of the Congo, Democratic Republic of the Congo, Equatorial Guinea, Gabon, Kenya, Nigeria, South Sudan, Tanzania, Uganda, and Zambia. Its natural habitats are subtropical or tropical moist lowland forest, subtropical or tropical swamps, and moist savanna.

References

External links
Image at ADW 

chestnut wattle-eye
Birds of the Gulf of Guinea
Birds of Central Africa
chestnut wattle-eye
chestnut wattle-eye
Taxonomy articles created by Polbot
Taxobox binomials not recognized by IUCN